Isaiah 23 is the twenty-third chapter of the Book of Isaiah in the Hebrew Bible or the Old Testament of the Christian Bible. This book contains the prophecies attributed to the prophet Isaiah, and is one of the Books of the Prophets. This chapter foretells the destruction of Tyre due to its pride (Isaiah 23:1-14), its rising again (Isaiah 23:15-17), and its conversion to God (Isaiah 23:18).

Text 

The original text was written in Hebrew language. This chapter is divided into 18 verses.

Textual witnesses
Some early manuscripts containing the text of this chapter in Hebrew are of the Masoretic Text tradition, which includes the Codex Cairensis (895), the Petersburg Codex of the Prophets (916), Aleppo Codex (10th century), Codex Leningradensis (1008).

Fragments containing parts of this chapter were found among the Dead Sea Scrolls (3rd century BC or later):
 1QIsaa: complete
 1QIsab: extant verses 1‑5
 4QIsaa (4Q55): extant verses 1‑12
 4QIsac (4Q57): extant verses 8‑18

There is also a translation into Koine Greek known as the Septuagint, made in the last few centuries BCE. Extant ancient manuscripts of the Septuagint version include Codex Vaticanus (B; B; 4th century), Codex Sinaiticus (S; BHK: S; 4th century), Codex Alexandrinus (A; A; 5th century) and Codex Marchalianus (Q; Q; 6th century).

Parashot
The parashah sections listed here are based on the Aleppo Codex. Isaiah 23 is a part of the Prophecies about the Nations (Isaiah 13–23). {P}: open parashah; {S}: closed parashah.
 {P} 23:1-14 {S} 23:15-18 {P}

Proclamation against Tyre

Verse 1
 The burden of Tyre.
 Howl, ye ships of Tarshish; for it is laid waste, so that there is no house, no entering in:
 from the land of Chittim it is revealed to them.
 "Burden": the keyword in the superscriptions for a total of nine similar oracles; the others being: Isaiah 13:1; 15:1; 17:1; 19:1; 21:1, 11, 13; 22:1.
The city was already prosperous in 14th century BC as a major trading port. It was strongly fortified but at the end was laid waste after it was conquered by Alexander the Great. The modern city is the continuation of ancient extension of the city in the mainland.
 "Tarshish" (Hebrew: תרשיש ): a faraway port, generally identified as "Tartessos" (Greek: Ταρτησσός) in Spain, located in the mouth of Guadalquivir river, where the Phoenicians are said to establish the first anchorage grounds and deal in precious metals. Other possibilities include: Tarsus in Cilicia, Tyrseni in Etruscan/Tuscany, or Carthage in North Africa.
 "Chittim" (or "Kittim"; Hebrew: כתים ): "Citienses", "Cypriotes" or "Cyprians", a Phoenecian colony in Citium (=Kition), Cyprus. The term is also used in general for places beyond Cyprus, as far as Greece.

See also

Assyria
Egypt
Chaldea
Chittim (=Kittim)
Shihor
Sidon
Tarshish
Tyre

Related Bible parts: 1 Kings 5, Jeremiah 47, Ezekiel 26, Joel 3, Amos 1

References

Sources

External links

Jewish
Isaiah 23 Hebrew with Parallel English

Christian
Isaiah 23 English Translation with Parallel Latin Vulgate

23
Phoenicians in the Hebrew Bible